Rémi Quirion,  (born January 9, 1955) is a Canadian scientist. He is the first Chief Scientist of Quebec.

Born in Lac-Drolet, Quebec, Quirion received a Ph.D. from Université de Sherbrooke in 1980. He was a Professor of Psychiatry at McGill University and Scientific Director of the Douglas Hospital Research Centre.

Honours
In 1993, he was made a Knight of the National Order of Quebec. In 2004, he was awarded the Government of Quebec's Prix Wilder-Penfield. In 2006, he was made an Officer of the Order of Canada. He is also a recipient of the Queen Elizabeth II Diamond Jubilee Medal. In 1997, he was awarded the Léo-Pariseau Prize and the Prix Michel-Sarrazin in 2007.

References

External links 
 Le scientifique en chef

1955 births
Living people
Knights of the National Order of Quebec
Academic staff of McGill University
Officers of the Order of Canada
People from Estrie
Université de Sherbrooke alumni